Deinias was an ancient Greek writer of the 4th century BC, and is possibly the person mentioned by Demosthenes as a skilled orator.

References 
Entry in the Dictionary of Greek and Roman Biography and Mythology by Smith and others

4th-century BC Greek people
4th-century BC writers
Ancient Greek writers